The Cleveland Elementary School shooting (also known as the Stockton schoolyard shooting and the Cleveland School massacre) occurred on January 17, 1989, at Cleveland Elementary School at 20 East Fulton Street in Stockton, California, United States. The gunman, Patrick Purdy, who had an extended criminal history, shot and killed five schoolchildren and wounded 32 others. As first responders arrived at the scene, Purdy committed suicide by shooting himself in the head. His victims were predominantly Southeast Asian refugees.

The attack was the U.S. non-college school shooting with the highest number of fatalities and injuries until the Columbine High School massacre, and of all U.S. school shootings in the 1980s, it had the largest number of victims.

Shooting

Tuesday morning January 17, 1989, an anonymous person phoned the Stockton Police Department regarding a death threat against Cleveland Elementary School in Stockton, California. At noon that day, Patrick Purdy, a disturbed drifter and former Stockton resident, began his attack by setting his fireworks-laden Chevrolet station wagon on fire with a Molotov cocktail after parking it behind the school, later causing the vehicle to explode. Purdy went to the school playground, where he began firing with a semi-automatic rifle from behind a portable building. Purdy fired 106 rounds in three minutes, killing five children and wounding thirty others, including one teacher.

All of those who died and many of the wounded were Cambodian and Vietnamese immigrants, who had come with their families to the U.S. as refugees. Purdy committed suicide by shooting himself in the head with a pistol.

Perpetrator

Patrick Edward Purdy (November 10, 1964 – January 17, 1989) was an unemployed former welder and drifter. He was born in Tacoma, Washington, to Patrick Benjamin Purdy and Kathleen Purdy (née Toscano). His father was a soldier in the U.S. Army and was stationed at Fort Lewis at the time of his son's birth. When the younger Purdy was two years old, his mother filed for divorce against her husband after he had threatened to kill her with a firearm. Toscano later moved with her son to South Lake Tahoe before settling in Stockton, California. Purdy attended Cleveland Elementary from kindergarten through second grade.

Purdy's mother remarried in September 1969; she divorced her husband four years later. Albert Gulart Sr., Purdy's stepfather, said Purdy was an overly quiet child who cried often. In fall 1973, Kathleen separated from Gulart and moved with her children from Stockton to the Sacramento area. In December of that year, the Sacramento Child Protective Services were twice called to her residence, on allegations that Kathleen was physically abusing her children. When Purdy was thirteen, he struck his mother in the face and was permanently banned from her house. He lived on the streets of San Francisco for a period before being placed in foster care by authorities. He was later placed in the custody of his father, who was living in Lodi, California, at the time. While attending Lodi High School, Purdy became an alcoholic and a drug addict, and attended high school sporadically.

On September 13, 1981, Purdy's father died after being struck by a car. His family filed a wrongful-death suit in San Joaquin Superior Court against the driver of the car, asking for US$600,000 in damages; the suit was later dismissed. Purdy accused his mother of taking money his father had left him, using the money to buy a car and taking a vacation to New York City. This incident appeared to deepen the animosity between them. After his father's death, Purdy was briefly homeless, before being placed in the custody of a foster mother in Los Angeles.

Purdy's criminal activities had begun by 1977, when Sacramento police confiscated BB guns from then 12-year-old Purdy. In June 1980, Purdy was first arrested at age 15 for a court-order violation. He was arrested that same month for underage drinking. Purdy was then arrested for prostitution in August 1980, possession of marijuana and drug dealing in 1982, and in 1983 for possession of an illegal weapon and receipt of stolen property. On October 11, 1984, he was arrested for being an accomplice in an armed robbery at a service station, for which he spent 32 days in the Yolo County Jail. In 1986, Kathleen called police after Purdy vandalized her car after she refused to give him money for narcotics.

In April 1987, Purdy and his half-brother Albert were arrested for firing a semi-automatic pistol at trees in the Eldorado National Forest. At the time, he was carrying a book about the white supremacist group Aryan Nations. He told the County Sheriff that it was his "duty to help the suppressed and overthrow the suppressor." In prison, he twice attempted suicide, once by hanging himself with a rope made out of strips of his shirt, and a second time by cutting his wrists with his fingernails. A subsequent psychiatric assessment found him to have a mild mental impairment, and to be a danger to himself and others.

In the fall of 1987, Purdy began attending welding classes at San Joaquin Delta College; he complained about the high percentage of Southeast Asian students there. In October 1987, he left California and drifted among Oregon, Nevada, Texas, Florida, Connecticut, South Carolina, and Tennessee, searching for jobs. In early 1988, he worked at Numeri Tech, a small machine shop located in Stockton. From July to October 1988, he worked as a boilermaker in Portland, Oregon, living in Sandy with his aunt.

On August 3 in Sandy, he purchased a Chinese-made AK-47 at Sandy Trading Post, which he later used in the shooting. He eventually returned to Stockton and rented a room at the El Rancho Motel on December 26. After the shooting, police found his room decorated with numerous toy soldiers. On December 28, Purdy purchased a Taurus 9mm pistol at the Hunter Loan pawn shop in Stockton.

Police stated that Purdy had problems with alcohol and drug addiction. He talked openly of hatred toward Asian immigrants, believing that they took jobs from "native-born" Americans. According to Purdy's friends, who described him as friendly and never violent toward anyone, he was suicidal at times and frustrated that he failed to "make it on his own". Steve Sloan, a night-shift supervisor at Numeri Tech, said: "He was a real ball of frustration, and was angry about everything." Another one of Purdy's former co-workers stated, "He was always miserable. I've never seen a guy that didn't want to smile as much as he didn't." In a notebook found in a hotel where he lived in early 1988, Purdy wrote about himself in the following terms: "I'm so dumb, I'm dumber than a sixth-grader. My mother and father were dumb."

Reaction and aftermath

The multiple murders at Stockton received national news coverage and spurred calls for regulation of semiautomatic weapons. "Why could Purdy, an alcoholic who had been arrested for such offenses as selling weapons and attempted robbery, walk into a gun shop in Sandy, Oregon, and leave with an AK-47 under his arm?", Time magazine asked. The article continued: "The easy availability of weapons like this, which have no purpose other than killing human beings, can all too readily turn the delusions of sick gunmen into tragic nightmares." Immediately following the shooting, Michael Jackson made a short visit to the school and met with some of the children affected by the event.

On September 14, 1989 (four mouths after the shooting) in Louisville, Kentucky, Joseph Wesbacker (who was allegedly inspired by Purdy) shot up his former workplace using an AK-56 that Purdy also used, killing 8 people and injured 12 others before committing suicide. When police raided his house, they found a TIME magazine issue with an article on Purdy.

In California, measures were taken to first define and then ban assault weapons, resulting in the Roberti-Roos Assault Weapons Control Act of 1989. On the federal level, Congressional legislators struggled with a way to ban weapons such as military-style rifles without banning sporting-type rifles. In 1989, the ATF issued a rule citing the lack of "sporting purpose" to ban importation of assault weapons. In July 1989, the G.H.W. Bush Administration made the import ban permanent. The Federal Assault Weapons Ban was enacted in 1994, and expired in 2004. President Bill Clinton signed another executive order in 1994 which banned importation of most firearms and ammunition from Mainland China.

In culture
Cambodian-American writer Anthony Veasna So's short story collection Afterparties (2021), the mass shooting is a major element in the last story in the book, "Generational Differences".

Janet Jackson's "Livin In A World (They Didn't Make)" from her album Janet Jackson's Rhythm Nation 1814 (1989) was in reference to the shooting.

See also

List of school shootings in the United States
 List of homicides in California

References

Further reading 
25th Anniversary of Cleveland Elementary Shooting, The Huffington Post (January 16, 2014)
20 years later: Remembering the Tragedy, The Stockton Record (January 18, 2009)
Five Children Killed As Gunman Attacks A California School, The New York Times (January 18, 1989)
After Shooting, Horror but Few Answers, The New York Times (January 19, 1989)
Effort to Ban Assault Rifles Gains Momentum, The New York Times (January 28, 1989)
Ban on Assault Rifles Takes Effect in Los Angeles, The New York Times (March 3, 1989)
Stockton Journal; Where 5 Died, a Monk Gives Solace, The New York Times (May 11, 1989)
Title 18 USC Chapter 44 — PDF file
Title 26 USC Chapter 53 — PDF file

1989 in California
1989 mass shootings in the United States
1989 murders in the United States
Arson in California
Asian-American-related controversies
Attacks in the United States in 1989
Car and truck bombings in the United States
Deaths by firearm in California
Elementary school killings in the United States
Elementary school shootings in the United States
History of Stockton, California
January 1989 crimes
January 1989 events in the United States
Mass murder in 1989
Mass murder in California
Mass murder in the United States
Mass shootings in California
Mass shootings in the United States
Murder–suicides in California
Racially motivated violence against Asian-Americans
School massacres in the United States